Trent Nelson Taylor (born April 30, 1994) is an American football wide receiver and punt returner for the Cincinnati Bengals of the National Football League (NFL). He played college football at Louisiana Tech and was drafted by the San Francisco 49ers in the fifth round of the 2017 NFL Draft.

Early years
Taylor attended Evangel Christian Academy in Shreveport, Louisiana, where he played high school football for the Eagles. He had 107 receptions for 1,650 yards and 20 touchdowns his senior year and 65 catches for 1,075 yards and 18 touchdowns his junior year. He committed to Louisiana Tech University to play college football.

College career
Taylor attended Louisiana Tech from 2013 to 2016. During his career, Taylor had 327 receptions for 4,179 yards and 32 touchdowns. The 327 receptions were a school record. In his final collegiate game, he was named the MVP of the 2016 Armed Forces Bowl after recording 12 receptions for 233 yards and two touchdowns.

College statistics

Source:

Professional career

San Francisco 49ers
The San Francisco 49ers selected Taylor in the fifth round (177th overall) of the 2017 NFL Draft.

On September 10, 2017, in his NFL debut, Taylor had one reception for eight yards in the season opening 23–3 loss at home to the Carolina Panthers. In Week 3, against the Los Angeles Rams, he scored his first career touchdown, a three-yard pass from quarterback Brian Hoyer, in the fourth quarter, as the 49ers narrowly lost 41-39. Taylor finished his rookie season with 43 receptions for 430 yards and two touchdowns.

On September 20, 2019, Taylor was placed on injured reserve after suffering a setback from offseason foot surgery.

In the first game of 2020 and Taylor's first game since 2018, he caught two passes for 7 yards and returned 2 punts for 21 yards as the 49ers lost 24-20 to the Arizona Cardinals. He was placed on the reserve/COVID-19 list by the 49ers on December 23, 2020, and activated on January 6, 2021.

Cincinnati Bengals
On May 17, 2021, Taylor signed with the Cincinnati Bengals. He was waived on August 31, 2021 and re-signed to the practice squad the next day. He finished the regular season with 2 receptions for 41 yards, 4 kick returns for 68 yards, and 7 punts for 52 yards. On January 29, 2022, Taylor was promoted to the active roster for the AFC Championship Game. He caught a pass from Joe Burrow for a two-point conversion, tying the game at 21 in a game the Bengals went on to win 27–24, securing the Bengals' first Super Bowl appearance since Super Bowl XXIII in 1988. 

On February 22, 2022, Taylor re-signed with the Bengals. He opened the 2022 season as the Bengals' primary punt returner along with being the team's backup slot receiver to starter Tyler Boyd. In the team's Week 1 loss to the Pittsburgh Steelers, Taylor returned 5 punts for 31 yards. In Week 9 against the Carolina Panthers, Taylor recorded 98 total yards, catching 3 passes for 18 yards, rushing for 14 yards on 2 attempts, in addition to returning 2 kicks for 15 yards and 3 punts for 52 yards along with fumbling a ball that the Bengals recovered. In Week 14 in a win against the Cleveland Browns, Taylor recorded one reception for a season-long 34 yards and returned 3 punts for 14 yards.

References

External links
San Francisco 49ers bio
Louisiana Tech Bulldogs bio

1994 births
Living people
Players of American football from Shreveport, Louisiana
American football wide receivers
Louisiana Tech Bulldogs football players
San Francisco 49ers players
Cincinnati Bengals players